Jullie Hjetland is a Danish musician and composer who records in folk, jazz and electronica genres.

Life and career

Hjetland completed her bachelor's degree in folk music at the Carl Nielsen Academy of Music in Odense. She was awarded a master's degree in folk music from the Ole Bull Academy in Voss, Norway (part of the University of Bergen).

Born to a Danish mother and a Norwegian father, Hjetland records in eight Nordic languages. She is the frontwoman of the Danish folk band Basco, also performing folk-influenced electronic music as part of her project Lukkif. Paste magazine describes Hjetland a "shining light of the Danish Nordic roots scene" and praises her "huge vocal range". Hjetland has also collaborated with the Danish musician and composer  to form a duo combining elements of folk, dream-pop and ambient music.

She was named Musician / Singer of the Year in 2014.

References

External links
, via official YouTube channel
, in Danish and English

Living people
Danish folk singers
Danish electronic musicians
21st-century Danish singers
21st-century Danish musicians
Danish women musicians
Danish women composers
21st-century Danish composers
Year of birth missing (living people)
21st-century women composers